Gibberella baccata is a fungal plant pathogen. It is a common finding worldwide. It is common in soil and in woody plants, especially in tree tissues.

Hosts 
Hosts include Citrus spp., hardwood lumber trees, coffee, plum, apple (Malus spp.), and mulberry (Morus spp.).

References

External links 
 Index Fungorum
 USDA ARS Fungal Database

Fungal plant pathogens and diseases
baccata
Fungi described in 1817